Tarachodes aestuans is a species of praying mantis in the family Eremiaphilidae.

See also
List of mantis genera and species

References

Tarachodes
Insects described in 1895